The Round Island Lighthouse (also known as the Trincomalee Light or Kevuliya Light) is an offshore lighthouse on Round Island in Trincomalee Bay, Sri Lanka and is operated and maintained by the Sri Lanka Ports Authority. The lighthouse was erected in 1863, originally it was a red light however in 1864 it was changed to white.

The  lighthouse is located atop a small island in the bay; one of the white sectors marks the proper line of entrance to the harbor. It is accessible only by boat however both the island and lighthouse are closed to the public.

See also 
 List of lighthouses in Sri Lanka

References

External links 
 Round Island Light (Sri Lanka)
 Sri Lanka Ports Authority
 Lighthouses of Sri Lanka

Lighthouses completed in 1863
Lighthouses in Sri Lanka
Buildings and structures in Trincomalee
Tourist attractions in Eastern Province, Sri Lanka